Julio Domingo Estrada Caceres (born July 4, 1970) is a Puerto Rican professional wrestler and manager, better known as Rico Suave. He is best known for his 18-year run in the World Wrestling Council promotion.

Career
Estrada started training to become a wrestler at age 14 and made his debut in 1984 wrestling under various names mostly at independent shows in east of Puerto Rico. Teamed with Solid Gold #1 which was his father José Estrada Sr. former WWF, WWE wrestler in 1991 in the Americas Wrestling Federation in Puerto Rico. He left the company to enter WWC in 1992, where he worked with his brother Jose Estrada Jr. and later became the top manager in the company that year when Joe Don Smith left to play for the then-expansion team Colorado Rockies so Estrada took his spot and managed various wrestlers like Greg Valentine, Dick Murdoch, Eddie Gilbert, Kane, Buddy Landell, Mabel, Val Venis, Glamour Boy Shane, Abdullah the Butcher, Ray Gonzalez, El Nene, Rex King, El Diamante, La Tigresa, Victor The Bodyguard, Jesus Castillo, "Jungle" Jim Steele, Chicky Starr and others. Feuded with Carlos Colon on and off for many years.

Had a memorable feud with Antonio Pantojas known as El Profe that lasted a long time during the 90s.

In 1998 he also was the leader of Invasion Azteca, which was a Mexican group that came to invade WWC combined by Pierroth, Jr., Jerry Estrada, Villano III and the late Texano Sr. Estrada spoke with a Mexican accent and used a Sarape during that angle.

Estrada toured Japan in 2000 where he competed at Big Japan Pro Wrestling known as Crazy Sheik.

By 2003 Estrada became a good guy after twelve years working in WWC as a Heel when Estrada was attacked by longtime allied El Bronco I after Estrada allegedly ripped an El Bronco picture. El Bronco I and La Revolición Dominicana (The Dominican Revolution) lead El Bronco I attacked Estrada.

Estrada is the leader of El Poder Supremo (The Supreme Power) Heel stable in the WWC. On November 23, 2006, he managed Hannibal and Black Pain to win the WWC Tag Team titles from Jesus Castillo and Chris Joel in Carolina, Puerto Rico.

Began using the nickname "Mr. Hardcore" when he adopted the Hardcore wrestling style and formed a tag team with Huracan Castillo Jr. and formed "La Evolucion Hardcore" or The Hardcore Evolution due to the hardcore wrestling style that this two superstars have. Being both the most dangerous second-generation tag-team wrestlers to dominate Puerto Rico. Estrada then moved on to work in Japan where he tagged with Abdullah The Butcher, went to Mexico and various independent companies in the United States. Quit WWC in June 2009 after a dispute with the office.

Personal life
Julio Estrada married Ruby Colón on October 16, 2010, in Florida where he resides. Estrada still continues to wrestle in Florida at charity wrestling events but had a career in loss prevention. He now works as a transporter for Cleveland Clinic in Vero Beach, Florida and graduated as a Phlebotomist. He is also the godfather of Bronco I youngest son.

Championships and accomplishments
Independent Wrestling Association Florida
IWA Florida Tag Team Championship (1 time) - with Ricky Ortiz
Pro Wrestling Illustrated
 PWI ranked him #255 of the top 500 singles wrestlers in the PWI 500 in 2003
South Carolina Championship Wrestling
 SCCW Tag Team Championship  - with Joe Don Smith (1 time)
 World Wrestling Council
 WWC Caribbean Heavyweight Championship (2 times) 
 WWC Puerto Rico Heavyweight Championship (3 times)
 WWC Television Championship (5 times) 
 WWC Tag Team Championship (10 times) - with Eddie Watts (1), Ricky Santana (1), Agente Bruno (1),     Diabolico (2), Eric Alexander (1), Tim Arson (2), El Bronco #1 (1) and Huracán Castillo (1)

See also
Professional wrestling in Puerto Rico

References 

1970 births
20th-century professional wrestlers
21st-century professional wrestlers
Living people
Masked wrestlers
People from Humacao, Puerto Rico
Puerto Rican male professional wrestlers
Professional wrestling trainers
Professional wrestling managers and valets
WWC Puerto Rico Champions
WWC Television Champions